Richard Avery Lyon (September 7, 1939 – July 8, 2019) was an American rower who competed in the 1964 Summer Olympics and in the 1972 Summer Olympics. He was born in San Fernando, California. In 1964 he was a crew member of the American boat which won the bronze medal in the coxless fours event. Eight years later he finished ninth with his partner Larry Hough in the coxless pair competition.

References 

Dick Lyon's obituary

1939 births
2019 deaths
Rowers at the 1964 Summer Olympics
Rowers at the 1972 Summer Olympics
Olympic bronze medalists for the United States in rowing
Stanford Cardinal rowers
American male rowers
Medalists at the 1964 Summer Olympics